Forum-Dimensions (FD, Forum-Dimensions or Forum) is the official student publication of West Visayas State University (WVSU). It is one of the oldest student publications in Western Visayas and the Philippines.

History
Forum-Dimensions was established in March 1939 as The Normalite, founded by Vicente M. Perez who served as its first adviser. It is one of the oldest student publications in the Philippines. After three issues from 1939 to 1940, it closed with the outbreak of World War II and was dormant  from 1941 to 1946. Shortly after the war, the old Iloilo Normal School building was burned including the publication's first print-outs. Its formal revival was met with gaiety and excitement and, in the reorganization of the editorial board in 1947, Mrs. Adelina A. Zerrudo was named editor. This marked the rehabilitation of the institutional publication.
 
The issues of the 1950s reflected in their pages a kind of hiatus before the mighty turmoil of the 1960s. The hippie cult, drug addiction, juvenile delinquency and progressive reform became the favorite topics. The anguish of youth culminated in student activism. Students’ articles questioned and shook the secure foundations of the government.

On May 4, 1965, Iloilo Normal School became West Visayas State College by virtue of R.A. 4189. In 1970, The Normalite was changed to WVSC Forum. With the imposition of martial law in 1972, and the establishment of the so-called "New Society", the philosophy and the concepts of development communication were adopted by the Forum and became an active partner of the Ministry of Public Information, now the Philippine Information Agency. In 1976, the Ministry of Public Information founded the Regional College Press Conference to acknowledge college and university publications in Western Visayas. This challenged the student publication to participate in thrusts toward changes in attitudes, beliefs, skills, and social norms as imperative in the developing society.

WVSC Dimensions was born to inspire the students of the demands of developmental communication in 1978. Ramon G. Zarceno was its first editor. WVSC Dimensions was first produced as a graduation issue at the end of the academic year to cover stories about graduates and the commencement exercises.

The 1980s chronicled changes that happened in society – reforms and the advent of clashing ideologies that led to a level of critical thinking. On January 27, 1986, the college became the West Visayas State University through decree PD. 2019 of President Ferdinand Marcos.

However, in the 1990s, WVSC Dimensions focused on significant societal issues of that era. Each publication included stories with a central theme. Among these were feminism and student life.

The 1990s kept the reading public attuned to the prevailing concepts, beliefs and concerns of the changing seasons of life. The student publication also ran stories in line with the Centennial of the Philippine Independence in 1998.

The tradition of Dimensions continued in the first decade of the 21st century. More bold themes were tackled that included fear, superstitious beliefs, time and reality shows. In this era, The Forum highlighted student and institutional achievements while rarely publishing articles critical of the school administration and government. These schemes were well received in the annual College Press Conference of college student publications spearheaded by the Philippine Information Agency Western Visayas. It introduced innovations in layout and content that became trends.

The dramatic rise in the number of new media users in the early days of 2010s set a new tone for the student publication. It was confronted with a generation of non-readers and a declining appeal to the students. Social networking sites became its tools to counter the phenomena. A regularly updated Facebook page and blogspot were conceived to serve the student publication's purpose while awaiting for the release of its hard copy issues at the end of every semester.

Publications

The Forum
The Forum is the official student newspaper of West Visayas State University. It is printed as a broadsheet or tabloid. It was first known as Normalite but was changed to WVSC Forum in 1969. In 1989, it was changed to The Forum as it is today. The newspaper has been an achiever in various competitions in Western Visayas. It has been a regular participant in the annual College Press Conference organized by the Philippine Information Agency VI.

Dimensions
Dimensions is the official student magazine of West Visayas State University. It was founded in 1978 to inspire the students of the demands of developmental communication. The first issue of Dimensions was published in the first semester of the 1978-1979 academic year and was recognized as the second best campus magazine in the College Press Conference that year. The second edition was the graduation issue in March 1979. The magazine has been a regular topnotcher in the annual College Press Conference organized by the Philippine Information Agency VI.

Handuraw
Handuraw is the official literary folio of Forum-Dimensions. It was founded in 1976, and has been one of the pioneer college literary supplements in Western Visayas.

Recess
Recess is the official creative folio of Forum-Dimensions. It features dainty and amusing creative articles that bring a menu of fun and excitement, and stories that are easy to nimble for the human brain. It was first published in 2001.

Taghol
Taghol is the official wall newspaper of Forum-Dimensions. It was first published in 2013.

Editorial Board for Academic Year 2016-2017

Past editors in chief

 Romeo P. Banias, 1949-1950
 Luis E. Escomes,1950-1951
 Gabriel M. Cordero, 1953 (November to December)
 Purita M. Dullano, 1954 (January to March)
 Luis E. Escomes, 1954 (May)
 Encarnacion Senador, 1954 (August to September)
 Ophelia Posecion, 1956 (February to March)
 Domingo J. Alfane, Jr., 1956 (October to November)
 Romeo P. Banias, 1956 (Vacation)
 Evelina E. Trinidad, 1957 (August to September)
 Rosario P. Alberto, 1959 (February to March)
 Luis E. Escomes, 1959 (April to May)
 Juanita T. de la Cruz, 1959 (June to July)
 Caesar V. Abadiano, 1959 (October to November)
 Anna P. Española, 1961 (November) and 1962 (March)
 Lilia Caspillo, 1962 (July to August)
 Rebecca Alarcon, 1962 (December) and 1963 (March)
 Paz Panogot, 1964 (February to March)
 Eva B. Dueñas, 1964 (September) and 1965 (May)
 Rhodora M. Napud, 1965 (October) and 1966 (April to May)
 Luisa C. Puljanan, 1966 (July) and 1967 (April)
 Vicente P. Baldevia, 1967 (September) and 1968 (March to April)
 Nenalyn P. Defensor, 1968 (October) and 1969 (March)
 Edmundo B. Montecastro, 1969 (April)
 Georgita P. Hormillosa, 1970 (February)
 Pacita M. Barcero, 1970 (April)
 Connie T. Jimenea, 1970-1971
 Lorna Sanchez, 1971-1972
 Nenita Vigil, 1972-1973
 Cecilia Ramirez, 1973-1974
 Sylvia S. Pongan, 1974-1975
 Grace C. Mamon, 1975-1976
 Edna A. Porquez, 1976-1977
 Fe C. Fernandez, 1977-1978
 Ramon G. Zarceno, 1978-1979
 Ma. Luisa P. Torreda, 1979-1980
 Cynthia D. Cabangal, 1980-1981
 Nellie Joy P. Dagoon, 1981-1982
 Ivan P. Suansing, 1982-1983
 Alma Banias, 1983-1984
 Victor Amantilla, Jr., 1984-1985
 John Colacion, 1985-1986
 Rock B. Biocos, 1986-1987
 Ricky G. Abaleña III and Ma. Lenny M. Rodriguez, 1987-1988
 Felnor O. Giron, 1988-1989
 Resan J. Raymundo, 1989-1990
 Roberto Abello Jr., Clarissa Baliao, and Fatima Caday, 1990-1991
 Randy Paul Dumaplin, 1991-1992
 Raymond B. Padilla and Ronie B. Ordoña, 1992-1993
 Jeffrey L. Celiz and Sulpicio G. Gamosa Jr., 1993-1994
 Jacquelyn A. Javier, 1994-1995
 Gilda L. Loricha and Mary Sol B. dela Pena, 1995-1996
 Myra Gift M. Malacaman, 1996-1998
 Carol R. Salvatierra, 1998-1999
 Rhea B. Peñaflor, 1999-2000
 Jenielle Marie R. Enojo, 2000-2001
 Ann Carlie G. Abaleña, 2001-2002
 Cedric Jaranilla, 2002-2003
 Ardonis D. Gonzales, 2003-2004
 Ardonis G. Gonzales and Nick F. Salinog, 2004-2005
 Jurex Phil G. Suson, 2005-2007
 Jemuel B. Garcia and Van Dayreen S. Domegelio, 2007-2008
 Jemuel B. Garcia and Daryl Z. Lasafin 2008-2009
 Erika C. Dimaguila and Daryl Z. Lasafin, 2009-2010
 Christopher M. Millora, 2010-2011
 Mitz S. Serofia and Mary Jade P. Gabanes, 2011-2012 
 Raimer Gel G. Caspillo and Mary Jade P. Gabanes, 2012-2013
 Jandi M. Nietes, 2013-2014
 Ian Leoj M. Gumban, 2014-2015
 Edelaine Ellenson Queen G. Encarguez, 2015-2016
 Alyssa Jude M. Montalban and Mary Zeliet L. Paris, 2016-2017
 Marjoe Renz Dominic P. Deita, 2017-2018
 Paula Floriz A. Acelar, 2018-2019
John Glen L. Teorima 2019-2021
Gerlyn Joy P. Rojo and Zynnie Rose C. Zaragosa 2021-2022

Awards and citations

Affiliations

 Member, College Editors Guild of the Philippines
 Philippine Information Agency VI
 Philippine Association of Campus Student Advisers (PACSA)
 Inkblots (The Varsitarian-University of Santo Tomas)

References

External links
Official blogger Site
Journ.ph page

West Visayas State University System
Student newspapers published in the Philippines
Newspapers published in Iloilo